The Events Leading Up to My Death is a Canadian comedy film, released in 1991. Written and directed by Bill Robertson, the film revolves around the dysfunctional Snack family around the time of the death of Busty, the family's pet dog.

The film's cast includes Rosemary Radcliffe, Peter MacNeill, John Allore, Linda Kash, Karen Hines, Maria del Mar and Mary Margaret O'Hara. O'Hara also composed much of the film's score.

The film premiered in September 1991 at the Toronto International Film Festival.

Robertson won the Acura Award for Best Canadian Screenplay at the Vancouver International Film Festival.

References

External links 
 

1991 films
Canadian comedy films
1991 directorial debut films
1991 comedy films
English-language Canadian films
1990s English-language films
1990s Canadian films